Mamman Sani is a self taught, Nigerian-Ghanaian musician. He first recorded his electronic organ music in 1978, but it remained largely obscure and undiscovered until 2013. He is considered to be an early pioneer of synth music in Niger.

Early life 
Mamman Sani was born in 1952, in Accra to a Nigerian father and a Ghanaian mother. Mamman came from a privileged family: his maternal grandfather was a chief in Ghana, and his paternal grandfather was a Colonel in the first World War. Towards the end of the 1950s his family moved to Niger, where his father became a librarian for the American Cultural Center, which gave him exposure to cultural materials from all over the world.

Musical career 
Mamman began to play music in 1968. "A mason lent me his harmonica for the weekends...on Saturday evenings I played the French hits of the time". Around this time hecomposed his first songs, playing regularly in the evening in public. He was a fan of Otis Redding, James Brown, Percy Sledge. After being an English teacher for some years, he got a job as a UNESCO functionary. In his role at UNESCO Mamman began to travel internationally, including trips to Europe and Japan. During a UNESCO meeting, a delegate from Rwanda brought an Italian Orla electronic organ. Mamman was captivated by the sound, and convinced him to sell it.

While continuing to work for UNESCO, he slowly became recognized locally for his musical talent. His first professional experience as a musician was being hired by Niger's national television station to compose credits and interludes for their shows.

In 1978 he recorded his first album, at Niger National Radio, in two takes. In coordination with the Minister of Culture, the album was released in a limited series of cassettes showcasing modern Niger music. "His explorations in sound involved a myriad of elements but his rendering of the tende drum rhythms of the Toumani tribes in warm electronic tones created beacons of sound for those seeking sonic shelter from the white noise storm." The album was distributed locally via cassette tapes.

In 2013, Christopher Kirkley, an American musician and producer with a specialty in Sahelian music, discovered Mamman's recordings while searching through the musical archives of the Niamey museum. Kirkley described hearing Mamman's music: “It was esoteric and bizarre, unlike anything I had ever head—the imaginary audio track to an arcade game of desert caravans trek through an pastoral landscape of 8-bit acacias and pixelized sand.” That year Kirkley released the recordings through his Portland-based record label Sahel Sounds, as "La Musique Electronique du Niger".

References 

1952 births
Living people